Kristofer Leirdal (15 December 1915– 6 July 2010) was a Norwegian sculptor and art educator. He was especially noted for his sculptural contributions to the restoration of the Nidaros Cathedral.

Biography
Leirdal was born in Aure in Møre og Romsdal, Norway.  He was the son of Sakarias Skogan (1880-1951) and Karen Leirdal (1883-1966).

He received his education at the Norwegian National Academy of Craft and Art Industry from  1936 to 1938 and at the Norwegian National Academy of Fine Arts under Professor Wilhelm Rasmussen  between 1938 and 1940.
He also was trained at the Royal Danish Academy of Fine Arts in Copenhagen under Professor Einar Utzon-Frank  from 1945-1946.

Leirdal worked as a sculptor at Nidaros Cathedral in Trondheim from 1941. He was a classically trained sculptor who was also adapted at the physical and stylistic frameworks of architecture. In 1990 Leirdal completed his last work at the cathedral.
Leirdal  participated the founding of Trondheim Academy of Fine Art and was an instructor in the sculpture class from 1946-5. He was also a teacher at the Department of Design and Color at the Architectural Department of the  Norwegian Institute of Technology from  1952-82.

Leirdal was active in the development of Trondheim Art Association. He was awarded the Benneches legat (1940), Statens stipend (1942) and Mohrs legat (1947). He received the Minnemedaljen in silver from the Royal Norwegian Society of Sciences and Letters (1965) and the Domkirkemedaljen in gold (198). In 1997 he was made Knight, First Class, of the Royal Norwegian Order of St. Olav.

He died at  Trondheim in 2010.

References

1915 births
2010 deaths
People from Aure, Norway
Norwegian sculptors
Oslo National Academy of the Arts alumni
Academic staff of the Norwegian Institute of Technology
Academic staff of the Norwegian University of Science and Technology
Recipients of the St. Olav's Medal